ROKS Jecheon (PCC-776) is a  of the Republic of Korea Navy.

Development and design 

The Pohang class is a series of corvettes built by different Korean shipbuilding companies. The class consists of 24 ships and some after decommissioning were sold or given to other countries. There are five different types of designs in the class from Flight II to Flight VI.

Construction and career 
Jecheon was launched on 8 December 1987 by Hanjin Heavy Industries. The vessel was commissioned on 3 May 1989.

While being moored in her namesake city, Jecheon on 18 August 2018, Deputy Mayor Geum Han-ju and 35 other people, including members of the Integrated Defense Council, members of security and local organizations, and citizens from all walks of life, visited the ship.

Gallery

References
 

Ships built by Hanjin Heavy Industries
Pohang-class corvettes
1987 ships
Corvettes of the Cold War